= Nima Drainage Channel =

Drainage channel in Greater Accra, Ghana

Nima Drainage Channel Nima-Paloma Drain

Location
- Country: Ghana
- Region: Greater Accra Region
- City: Accra

Physical characteristics
- Source: Northeastern Accra
  - location: Accra, Ghana
- Mouth: Odaw River
  - location: Near Kwame Nkrumah Circle, Accra

Basin features
- Progression: Nima Drainage Channel → Odaw River → Korle Lagoon → Gulf of Guine
- River system: Odaw River basin
- Purpose: Stormwater conveyance and flood control

Nima Drainage Channel (or Nima-Paloma Drain) is a drainage channel in the Greater Accra Region of Ghana. It is part of the region's flood control efforts and drains into the Odaw River.

The Greater Accra region is flood-prone, and the Nima Drain is an important part of the region's flood control. A 2016 flood was attributed in part to clogs within the Nima drain preventing rainwater from reaching the Odaw River. A variety of projects since then have aimed to reduce clogging and improve water flow. Reconstruction work on the channel began in 2024 but work was stopped in 2026 due to the Ghanaian government's dissatisfaction with the project's contractor.
